Aditya Puri is a senior advisor at The Carlyle Group. He was the managing director of HDFC Bank, India's largest private sector bank. He assumed this position in September 1994, with a vision to create a "World Class Indian Bank". Puri was the longest-serving head of any private bank in the country. India Today ranked him at #24 in India's 50 Most Powerful People of 2017 list.

Biography 

Aditya Puri was born in Gurdaspur District (Punjab) and studied at Punjab University, Chandigarh, gaining a bachelor's degree in Commerce. He qualified as a Chartered Accountant with the Institute of Chartered Accountants of India.

Career
He has worked in the banking sector for 40 years, in India and other countries. He became CEO of Citibank, Malaysia in 1992. In September 1994 he returned to India as managing director of HDFC Bank.

He presided over HDFC's acquisitions of Times Bank Limited in 2000 and of Centurion Bank of Punjab in 2010.

He officially stepped down from his position in HDFC Bank on 26 October 2020. Sashidhar Jagdishan took charge as the chief executive officer (CEO) of HDFC Bank from 27 October 2020. In January 2021, he joined the biopharma company Strides Group as Advisor and will also serve as a Director of its associate company, Stelis Biopharma.

Awards and honours

2020
 Induction in Chartered Accountants Hall of Fame

2019
 QIMPRO Platinum Standard Awards 2019 - National Statesman for Quality in Business 
"Corporate and Philanthropic leadership Award" by American Indian Foundation
"AIMA - JRD TATA Corporate Leadership Award" by the AIMA.

2018
 Barron's Top 30 Global CEOs
Named one of the "Best CEOs in the World" by the CEOWORLD magazine.

2016
The only Indian to feature in Fortunes Businessperson of the Year list.
Best CEO: Institutional Investor All-Asia Executive Team ranking 2016
Outstanding Business Leader of the year-CNBC-TV18 India Business Leader Awards (IBLA) 2015-16
FE Lifetime Achievement Award from Financial Express
Barron's World's Top 30 CEOs

2015
 Best CEO Award - Business Today
 Business Leader of the Year - AIMA Managing India Awards 2015
 World's 30 Best CEOs - Barron's
 Best CEO- Finance Asia poll on Asia's Best Companies 2015

2013
 Best Executive in India - Asiamoney
 Banker of the Year 2013 - Business Standard
 Best CEO - Institutional Investor
 Top Achiever - Sunday Standard Best Banker Awards
 Best Executive in India - Asia Money 2013Best Banker - FE

2008
 CNN-IBN Indian Businessman of the Year 2008

Personal life
He is the father of actress Amrita Puri and son Amit Puri
He is cousin of Bharat Puri MD of Pidilite Industries and Ex CMD of Cadbury India.

References 

Indian bankers
Living people
Businesspeople from Gurdaspur
Panjab University alumni
Year of birth missing (living people)
Indian accountants
HDFC Group